Pinches is the surname of the following people:
 Barry Pinches (born 1970), English snooker player
Jennifer Pinches (born 1994), British artistic gymnast 
John Pinches (1916–2007), English rower, Royal Engineers officer, medallist and author
Theophilus Pinches (1856–1934), British assyriologist

See also
Pincher (disambiguation)

English-language surnames